This article lists people, events and other subjects which are referred to as "of Alexandria".

of Alexandria 

 Ammonius of Alexandria (3rd century AD), a Greek philosopher from Alexandria and one of the founders of Neoplatonism.
 Appian of Alexandria (c. 95 – c. 165), a Roman historian 
 Athanasius of Alexandria (c. 293 – 2 May 373), also given the titles Athanasius the Great, Pope Athanasius I of Alexandria, and Athanasius the Apostolic, was a Christian theologian, bishop of Alexandria, Church Father, and a noted Egyptian leader of the fourth century. 
 Carpocrates of Alexandria, the founder of an early Gnostic sect from the first half of the second century.
 Catherine of Alexandria (c. 282 - c. 305), a Christian saint and martyr.
 Clement of Alexandria (c.150 - c. 215), a Christian theologian and the head of the noted Catechetical School of Alexandria
 Ctesibius of Alexandria (fl. 285–222 BC), a Greek inventor and mathematician in Alexandria, Ptolemaic Egypt.
 Cyril of Alexandria (c. 376 - 444), the Pope of Alexandria from 412 to 444.
 Cyrus of Alexandria (died about 641) a Melchite patriarch.
 Diophantus of Alexandria b. between 200 and 214 CE, d. between 284 and 298 CE), sometimes called "the father of algebra", an Alexandrian Greek mathematician.
 Euclid of Alexandria (fl 300BC), a Greek mathematician, often referred to as the "Father of Geometry".
 Saint Eulogius of Alexandria Greek Patriarch from 580 to 608.
 Eustochius of Alexandria
 Hero of Alexandria (c. 10–70 AD). an ancient Greek mathematician. 
 Herophilos of Alexandria (335-280 BC), a Greek physician
 Hesychius of Alexandria, a grammarian who flourished probably in the 5th century CE.
 Hypatia of Alexandria (AD 350 and 370; died March 415), a Greek scholar.
 Isidore of Alexandria  an Egyptian or Greek philosopher and one of the last of the Neoplatonists
 Menelaus of Alexandria (c. 70–140 CE), a Greek mathematician and astronomer.
 Nemesius of Alexandria (c. A.D. 390), a Christian philosopher, and the author of a treatise De Natura Hominis ("On Human Nature").
 Origen of Alexandria (185-254), an early Christian scholar and theologian, and one of the most distinguished writers of the early Christian Church.
 Pappus of Alexandria (c. 290 – c. 350), one of the last great Greek mathematicians of antiquity.
 Philo of Alexandria (20 BC – 50 AD), an Hellenistic Jewish philosopher 
 Ptolemy of Alexandria, a Greek mathematician, astronomer, geographer, astrologer in 2c AD.
 Saint Macarius of Alexandria (died 395), a monk in the Nitrian Desert.
 Theon of Alexandria (ca. 335 - ca. 405 AD), a Greek scholar and mathematician.
 Theophilus of Alexandria (died 412), Patriarch of Alexandria, Egypt from 385 to 412

Popes 

 List of Coptic Orthodox Popes of Alexandria
 Pope Abraham of Alexandria the 62nd Pope of the Coptic Orthodox Church from 975 to 978.
 Pope Alexander of Alexandria (died 17 April 326) was the nineteenth Patriarch of Alexandria from 313 to his death.
 Pope Anianus of Alexandria, the Patriarch of Alexandria from 68 to 82.
 Pope Demetrius of Alexandria Patriarch of Alexandria (189–232). 
 Pope Dionysius of Alexandria, the Pope of Alexandria from 248 to 265.
 Pope Dioscorus I of Alexandria was Patriarch of Alexandria from 444.
 Pope Heraclas of Alexandria, the thirteenth Pope of Alexandria between 232 and 248
 Pope Peter of Alexandria (d. 311)
 Pope Theonas of Alexandria, Pope of Alexandria between 282 and 300.
 Pope Timothy I of Alexandria, Pope of Alexandria between 378 and 384

Others 

 Battle of Alexandria
 Siege of Alexandria (47 BC) – fought between Roman forces. 
 Battle of Alexandria (30 BC) – fought between Roman forces . 
 Siege of Alexandria (619) – conducted by the Sassanid Empire against a Byzantine Empire. 
 Siege of Alexandria (641) – conducted by the Rashidun army against the Byzantine capital. 
 Battle of Alexandria (1799) – fought between French and Mamaluk forces. 
 Battle of Alexandria (1801) – fought between British and French forces. 
 Siege of Alexandria (1801) – fought between British and French forces. 
 Raid on Alexandria (1941) – an attack on British shipping by Italian special forces during WWII. 
 Bombardment of Alexandria (1882)
 Catechetical School of Alexandria
 Church of Alexandria
 Eastern Orthodox Church of Alexandria
 Library of Alexandria
 Lighthouse of Alexandria
 Muscat of Alexandria, a white wine grape.
 Patriarch of Alexandria
 Pope of the Coptic Orthodox Church of Alexandria
 List of Coptic Orthodox Popes of Alexandria 
 Coptic Orthodox Church of Alexandria
 Greek Orthodox Church of Alexandria

Set index articles